Shansiodon is a genus of dicynodont from Middle Triassic (Anisian and Ladinian) of China and South Africa (sp. indet.).

Dicynodonts
Anisian life
Middle Triassic synapsids of Africa
Triassic South Africa
Fossils of South Africa
Triassic synapsids of Asia
Triassic China
Fossils of China
Fossil taxa described in 1959
Anomodont genera